Second Sight is the fourth studio album by St. John's, Newfoundland-based band Hey Rosetta!. It was released in Canada by Sonic Records on October 21, 2014. It was released in Germany and Australia on October 24, 2014, and in the United States on January 27, 2015.

The album debuted at number six on the Canadian Albums Chart, selling 4,600 copies.  Second Sight won the 2015 Borealis Music Prize.

Track listing

References

2014 albums
Hey Rosetta! albums